Second Department may refer to:

 Second Department of Polish General Staff, Poland's military intelligence arm, 1918–1939
 A New York Supreme Court, Appellate Division